The 1942 SMU Mustangs football team was an American football team that represented Southern Methodist University (SMU) as a member of the Southwest Conference (SWC) during the 1942 college football season. In their first season under head coach Jimmy Stewart, the Mustangs compiled a 3–6–2 record (1–4–1 against conference opponents) and were outscored by a total of 133 to 126. The team played its home games at Ownby Stadium in the University Park suburb of Dallas.

Schedule

References

SMU
SMU Mustangs football seasons
SMU Mustangs football